The Museum of Vera Mukhina is a historical and art museum in Feodosiya, Crimea, dedicated to the childhood, youth and artwork of sculptor Vera Ignatyevna Mukhina.

History
The folk museum of sculptor Vera Mukhina, or the Museum complex "The Child's seascape painter Gallery, Museum of sculptor V. Mukhina" was established in a house of Mukhin's family. A wall of the Mukhin's old house was successfully included in the main facade of the museum building. A local administration made a decision to not completely destroy Mukhin's former house when a new block of houses was constructed at the end of 20th century. So, the original wall now decorates a modern museum. A memorial room of V. Mukhina and a part of her creative workshop were recreated with period furniture and instruments.

Exposition
The main part of the museum displays exhibits from the first half of the 20th century. Original works and copies are part of the museum's collection. The exposition gives an opportunity to trace the influences of the political and cultural life of the USSR on the sculptor and her work.

Sculptures
The pride of the museum is a layout of the sculptural composition Worker and Kolkhoz Woman which was presented at the Paris Exhibition of 1937. This composition the crown of the Soviet Pavilion at the exhibition.

Gallery

See also
Vera Mukhina
Worker and Kolkhoz Woman

References

Further reading
Zotov А., Mukhina Vera Ignatiyevna: People’s Artist of USSR. — М.-L.: Iskusstvo, 1944. — 16, [6] h. – (Маssovaiya biblioteka). – 15 000 cop. (cover) 
Voronov N. V., Mukhina Vera: (Мonograph). — М.: Obrazotvorcheskoe isskustvo, 1989. — 336 p. — 18 500 cop. —  (supercover)

External links
Tomb of V. I. Mukhina at Novodeviche cemetery 
91.html «Time», № 268, 19.11.1998 
Voronov N. V., «Worker and Kolkhoz Woman». — М.: the Moscow worker, 1990. — 80, 16 p. -(Biography of the Moscow monument). — 45 000 cop. 

Museums established in 1985
Museums in Crimea
Art museums and galleries in Russia
Biographical museums in Russia
Museum of Vera Mukhina